Will Nicholls is a professional wildlife cameraman and wildlife photographer from Northumberland in the United  Kingdom.

He has been awarded Young British Wildlife Photographer of the Year at the British Wildlife Photography Awards and overall winner at the RSPCA Young Photographer Awards.

Education
Nicholls was a student at the Newcastle Royal Grammar School between 2006 and 2013. He then studied Zoology at the University of Exeter in England between 2014 and 2017.

Career
Nicholls started taking pictures of wildlife when he was 12 years old. He has traveled across the United Kingdom, to Cambodia, Amazonia, Nepal and to other locations as a photographer and wildlife documentary maker. He has been interviewed by Live ‘n’ Deadly, BBC Countryfile and BBC News.

In 2015, Prince Harry spent time in a wildlife hide with Nicholls in search of red squirrels as part of a visit to learn about red squirrel conservation in the area. Nicholls has been involved in red squirrel (Sciurus vulgaris) conservation for a number of years, as the species is endangered in the United Kingdom.

Nature TTL 
He runs a free resource called Nature TTL, set up for nature photographers, which contains contributions and instructional articles by photographers. In 2019, Nature TTL launched the inaugural Nature TTL Photographer of the Year competition.

Awards
2009: Overall Winner, Young British Wildlife Photographer of the Year, British Wildlife Photography Awards
2011: Overall Winner, RSPCA Young Photographer Awards

Publications
On the Trail of Red Squirrels Hexham, UK: Wagtail, 2013. .

References

External links
 http://www.willnicholls.co.uk
 http://www.naturettl.com

Photographers from Northumberland
Nature photographers
Living people
1995 births